Velamen or velamen radicum is a spongy, multiple epidermis that covers the roots of some epiphytic or semi-epiphytic plants, such as orchid and Clivia species.

The velamen of an orchid is the white or gray covering of aerial roots (when dry, and usually more green when wet as a result of the appearance of underlying photosynthetic structures).  It is many cell layers thick and capable of absorbing atmospheric moisture and nutrients, but its main function may lie in protecting the underlying cells against damaging UV rays (Chomicki et al., 2015).

Often, the roots of orchids are associated with symbiotic fungi or bacteria; the latter may fix nutrients from the air.  This functionality allows the orchid to exist in locations that provide a reproductive or vegetative advantage such as improved exposure or reduced competition from other plant species.

The velamen also serves a mechanical function, protecting the vascular tissues in the root cortex, shielding the root from transpirational water loss, and, in many cases, adhering the plant to the substrate.

The typical orchid root has a stele of comparatively small diameter. It is surrounded by a cortex which is further enveloped by a highly specialized exodermis, most of which at maturity do not contain protoplasm. A few cells, however, are living and allow the passage of water through them. The exodermis is surrounded by velamen, consisting of one to several layers of cells, which can develop root hair under proper environmental conditions.

The velamen arises from the root tip by division of a special tissue. The dead cells of velamen diffuse light, thus giving it a grey appearance—except at the tips, where the chlorophyll become visible. Upon absorbing water, the dead cells become transparent, and the whole velamen tissue then appears green.

References 
 Chomicki, G., L. P. R. Bidel, F. Ming, M. Coiro, X. Zhang, Y. Wang, Y. Baissac, C. Jay-Allemand, and S. S. Renner. 2015. The velamen protects photosynthetic orchid roots against UV-B damage, and a large dated phylogeny implies multiple gains and losses of this function during the Cenozoic. New Phytologist 205(3): 1330–1341.

Plant morphology